Aptilo Networks is a company headquartered in Stockholm Sweden, which produces and markets software systems to manage mobile data and Wi-Fi services for 3G, LTE, WiMAX, Wi-Fi and fixed broadband networks, including solutions for mobile data offloading using Wi-Fi. Aptilo's service management platform controls billing, user services and access within the network. The company offers service management and policy control solutions for both telephony network operators and Internet service providers.

In addition to its headquarters, Aptilo has regional offices in Kuala Lumpur, Dallas Texas and Dubai.

Products and services
Aptilo Networks is a supplier of telecommunication software solutions for telecommunication operators including Wi-Fi and WiMAX service providers.  The company's product range includes policy control solutions, Radius servers, AAA servers, Hotspot (Wi-Fi) solutions, PCRF servers and Wi-Fi access equipment including software solutions for Wi-Fi calling in Evolved Packet Core networks.

Recent awards
Aptilo Networks has received the following awards:

 Fierce Innovation Awards 2015 Winner – Traffic Offload Category
 Light Reading – Company of the Year (Private) 2014, Leading Lights Award

History 
In September 2001, Aptilo Networks was founded by members of the former management group for Axis Communications' Mobile Internet division and took over the Mobile Access Server product and its development. In October 2001, Aptilo Networks secured its first large Wi-Fi deployment at Copenhagen Airport.  Aptilo has grown rapidly and currently has systems deployed in more than 70 countries by companies such as Hutchison 3G, TeliaSonera, Batelco, Telekom Malaysia and Telenor.

Acquisitions 
In January 2011, Aptilo acquired Service Factory, a division of Birdstep Technology.

External links
 Aptilo Networks' home page
 Compare Broadband Deals

References 

Software companies of Sweden
Telecommunications equipment vendors
Companies based in Stockholm